Eduardo Castro Almanza (born May 1, 1954) is a retired long-distance runner from Mexico, who won several medals during the early 1980s.

Achievements

References
 1982 Year Ranking
 

1954 births
Living people
Mexican male long-distance runners
Athletes (track and field) at the 1979 Pan American Games
Athletes (track and field) at the 1983 Pan American Games
Pan American Games gold medalists for Mexico
Athletes (track and field) at the 1984 Summer Olympics
Olympic athletes of Mexico
Pan American Games medalists in athletics (track and field)
Central American and Caribbean Games gold medalists for Mexico
Competitors at the 1978 Central American and Caribbean Games
Competitors at the 1982 Central American and Caribbean Games
Central American and Caribbean Games medalists in athletics
Medalists at the 1983 Pan American Games
20th-century Mexican people